Rex O'Malley (1901-1976) was a British actor. His mother was an Irish seamstress. He acted on Broadway, in films and in television. He remains perhaps best known for his supporting roles in Camille (1936) with Greta Garbo and Midnight (1939) starring Claudette Colbert and Don Ameche.

Broadway roles

 The Marquise (1927) as Miquel 
 The Bachelor Father (1928) as Geoffrey Trent
 The Apple Cart (1930) as Sempronius 
 Lost Sheep (1930) as Eric Bailey
 No More Ladies (1934) as James Salston
 Revenge with Music (1934) as Pablo
 Matrimony Pfd. (1936) as Dr. Robert Levy-de Coudray
 The Man Who Came to Dinner (1939) as Beverly Carlton
 The Cherry Orchard (1944) as Epikhodov, Semen Panteleevich a clerk
 Lute Song (1946) as Youen-Kong a steward
 Lady Windermere's Fan (1946) as Mr. Cecil Graham

Selected filmography
 Somebody's Darling (1925)
 Camille (1936) as Gaston
 Zaza (1939)
 Midnight (1939)
 The Thief (1952)

References

External links
 
 

1901 births
1976 deaths
British male film actors
Male actors from London
20th-century British male actors
British expatriate male actors in the United States